Dihydroorotate dehydrogenase (DHODH) is an enzyme that in humans is encoded by  the DHODH gene on chromosome 16. The protein encoded by this gene catalyzes the fourth enzymatic step, the ubiquinone-mediated oxidation of dihydroorotate to orotate, in de novo pyrimidine biosynthesis. This protein is a mitochondrial protein located on the outer surface of the inner mitochondrial membrane (IMM). Inhibitors of this enzyme are used to treat autoimmune diseases such as rheumatoid arthritis.

Structure 

DHODH can vary in cofactor content, oligomeric state, subcellular localization, and membrane association. An overall sequence alignment of these DHODH variants presents two classes of DHODHs: the cytosolic Class 1 and the membrane-bound Class 2. In Class 1 DHODH, a basic cysteine residue catalyzes the oxidation reaction, whereas in Class 2, the serine serves this catalytic function. Structurally, Class 1 DHODHs can also be divided into two subclasses, one of which forms homodimers and uses fumarate as its electron acceptor, and the other which forms heterotetramers and uses NAD+ as its electron acceptor. This second subclass contains an addition subunit (PyrK) containing an iron-sulfur cluster and a flavin adenine dinucleotide (FAD). Meanwhile, Class 2 DHODHs use coenzyme Q/ubiquinones for their oxidant.

In higher eukaryotes, this class of DHODH contains an N-terminal bipartite signal comprising a cationic, amphipathic mitochondrial targeting sequence of about 30 residues and a hydrophobic transmembrane sequence. The targeting sequence is responsible for this protein's localization to the IMM, possibly from recruiting the import apparatus and mediating ΔΨ-driven transport across the inner and outer mitochondrial membranes, while the transmembrane sequence is essential for its insertion into the IMM. This sequence is adjacent to a pair of α-helices, α1 and α2, which are connected by a short loop. Together, this pair forms a hydrophobic funnel that is suggested to serve as the insertion site for ubiquinone, in conjunction with the FMN binding cavity at the C-terminal. The two terminal domains are directly connected by an extended loop. The C-terminal domain is the larger of the two and folds into a conserved α/β-barrel structure with a core of eight parallel β-strands surrounded by eight α helices.

Function 

Human DHODH is a ubiquitous FMN flavoprotein. In bacteria (gene pyrD), it is located on the inner side of the cytosolic membrane. In some yeasts, such as in Saccharomyces cerevisiae (gene URA1), it is a cytosolic protein, whereas, in other eukaryotes, it is found in the mitochondria. It is also the only enzyme in the pyrimidine biosynthesis pathway located in the mitochondria rather than the cytosol.

As an enzyme associated with the electron transport chain, DHODH links mitochondrial bioenergetics, cell proliferation, ROS production, and apoptosis in certain cell types. DHODH depletion also resulted in increased ROS production, decreased membrane potential and cell growth retardation. Also, due to its role in DNA synthesis, inhibition of DHODH may provide a means to regulate transcriptional elongation.

Mechanism
In mammalian species, DHODH catalyzes the fourth step in de novo pyrimidine biosynthesis, which involves the ubiquinone-mediated oxidation of dihydroorotate to orotate and the reduction of FMN to dihydroflavin mononucleotide (FMNH2):

 (S)-dihydroorotate + O2  orotate + H2O2

The particular mechanism for the dehydrogenation of dihydroorotic acid by DHODH differs between the two classes of DHODH. Class 1 DHODHs follow a concerted mechanism, in which the two C–H bonds of dihydroorotic acid break in concert. Class 2 DHODHs follow a stepwise mechanism, in which the breaking of the C–H bonds precedes the equilibration of iminium into orotic acid.

Inhibitors 
 Brequinar
 Teriflunomide
 Leflunomide
 S416

Clinical significance

The immunomodulatory drugs teriflunomide and leflunomide have been shown to inhibit DHODH. Human DHODH has two domains: an alpha/beta-barrel domain containing the active site and an alpha-helical domain that forms the opening of a tunnel leading to the active site. Leflunomide has been shown to bind in this tunnel. Leflunomide is being used for treatment of rheumatoid and psoriatic arthritis, as well as multiple sclerosis. Its immunosuppressive effects have been attributed to the depletion of the pyrimidine supply for T cells or to more complex interferon or interleukin-mediated pathways, but nonetheless require further research.

Additionally, DHODH may play a role in retinoid N-(4-hydroxyphenyl)retinamide (4HPR)-mediated cancer suppression. Inhibition of DHODH activity with teriflunomide or expression with RNA interference resulted in reduced ROS generation in, and thus apoptosis of, transformed skin and prostate epithelial cells.

Mutations in this gene have been shown to cause Miller syndrome, also known as Genee-Wiedemann syndrome, Wildervanck-Smith syndrome or post-axial acrofacial dystosis.

Interactions 

DHODH binds to its FMN cofactor in conjunction with ubiquinone to catalyze the oxidation of dihydroorotate to orotate.

Model organisms
Model organisms have been used in the study of DHODH function. A conditional knockout mouse line called Dhodhtm1b(EUCOMM)Wtsi was generated at the Wellcome Trust Sanger Institute. Male and female animals underwent a standardized phenotypic screen to determine the effects of deletion. Additional screens performed:  - In-depth immunological phenotyping

References

Further reading

External links 
 

Protein domains
Peripheral membrane proteins